Lakkana Jayasekera (born 26 March 1996) is a Sri Lankan cricketer. He made his first-class debut for Badureliya Sports Club in the 2016–17 Premier League Tournament on 9 December 2016. He made his List A debut for Ampara District in the 2016–17 Districts One Day Tournament on 18 March 2017.

References

External links
 

1996 births
Living people
Sri Lankan cricketers
Ampara District cricketers
Badureliya Sports Club cricketers
Cricketers from Colombo